The Hebrew Academy of Cleveland is a private day school in Cleveland, Ohio with over 1,000 students. It provides Judaic and secular education from pre-school through high school. The Hebrew Academy was established in 1943 by the Telshe Yeshiva and was the first Jewish day school founded outside the east coast. In 1947, Yavne, a girls division, was added.

Divisions
 Early Childhood Division
 Girls Elementary Division
 Yeshiva Ketana / Boys Elementary Division
Yeshiva High School / The Oakwood Campus
 Beatrice J. Stone Yavne High School.

The Living Memorial Project
The Living Memorial Project is a project to develop a national curriculum to teach day school students about the Jewish world in Europe before the Holocaust, headed by members of the school faculty. The curriculum has included the "Learning For Letters" Mishnayos Program, dedicating a Sefer Torah in memory of the one million martyred children, a family genealogy project and four published textbooks which delve into pre-war life.

Notable alumni
 Brian Michael Bendis, comic book artist, writer of Marvel's Ultimate Spider-Man.
Jeff Jacoby (1977), conservative political commentator and Boston Globe columnist.

References

External links
 Official Hebrew Academy website
  List of Living Memorial Books
 http://www.cleveland.com/cleveland-heights/index.ssf/2015/11/new_hebrew_academy_of_clevelan.html 
 http://www.clevelandjewishnews.com/news/local_news/new-home-sweet-home/article_8a517ed8-79de-11e6-9ad0-fb242e042304.html

Jewish day schools
Jewish day schools in Ohio
Educational institutions established in 1943
Private schools in Ohio
Middle schools in Ohio
High schools in Cuyahoga County, Ohio
1943 establishments in Ohio